Euphorbia leistneri is a species of succulent plant in the family Euphorbiaceae. It is endemic to northwest-Namibia and southwest-Angola near the Kunene river.  Its natural habitat is subtropical or tropical dry shrubland. It is threatened by habitat loss. Euphorbia leistneri is closely related to Euphorbia monteiri.

References

Endemic flora of Namibia
leistneri
Vulnerable plants
Taxonomy articles created by Polbot